Tijana Bogićević (born 1 November 1981) is a Serbian singer. She represented Serbia in the Eurovision Song Contest 2017 with the song "In Too Deep" but failed to qualify to the final. Bogićević was previously a backing vocalist for Nina at the Eurovision Song Contest 2011. She also competed to represent Serbia in the Eurovision Song Contest 2009 through Beovizija 2009, but did not advance past the semi-final.

Bogićević first achieved major recognition in Serbia in 2013, after the release of her single "Čudo". The following year she released a duet with Aleksa Jelić, "Još jednom". Bogićević currently resides in the United States. She married Mark Robertson, the lead singer of the band Queen Of Hearts, in 2015.

Discography

Albums
 Čudo (2018)

Singles

References

External links

Living people
1981 births
Musicians from Novi Sad
21st-century Serbian women singers
Serbian pop singers
Eurovision Song Contest entrants for Serbia
Eurovision Song Contest entrants of 2017
Serbian expatriates in the United States
Beovizija contestants